Andrew Watkinson may refer to:

Andrew Watkinson (musician) in Endellion Quartet
Andrew Lancel, né Andrew Watkinson, actor
Andrew Watkinson (ecologist), winner of Marsh Ecology Award